This is a list of African-American newspapers in Illinois. To be included, a newspaper should be attested in a reliable source as an African-American newspaper published in Illinois. The list is divided by region, and the newspapers attested in each region are placed in alphabetic order by city.

Illinois' first African-American newspaper was the Cairo Weekly Gazette, established in 1862. The first in Chicago was The Chicago Conservator, established in 1878. An estimated 190 Black newspapers had been founded in Illinois by 1975, and more have continued to be established in the decades since.

While most such newspapers in Illinois have been local, some like the Chicago-based Chicago Defender and Muhammad Speaks have had a major national circulation and impact. National Black newspaper networks, including the Defender syndicate and Associated Negro Press, have also been headquartered in Chicago.

Northern Illinois

Northern Illinois covers the northern third of Illinois, and is by far the most populous of Illinois' regions. Most of population is concentrated in the Chicago metropolitan area, and most of the region's African American newspapers have likewise been concentrated in and near Chicago.

Central Illinois

Central Illinois is the middle third of the state. It includes the state capital Springfield and many other small cities such as Bloomington-Normal, Champaign-Urbana, Danville, Decatur, Galesburg and Peoria.

Southern Illinois

Southern Illinois or "Little Egypt" is the southern third of Illinois, and is the state's least populous region. Much of the population is concentrated in Metro East, a five-county region across the Mississippi River from St. Louis, Missouri. The state's first African American newspaper was established in Southern Illinois' southernmost town, Cairo, in 1862.

See also
History of African Americans in Chicago
List of African-American newspapers and media outlets
List of African-American newspapers in Iowa
List of African-American newspapers in Indiana
List of African-American newspapers in Missouri
List of African-American newspapers in Wisconsin

Works cited

References

Newspapers
Illinois
African-American
African-American newspapers